Abdelaziz Mohamed Ahmed (born 12 October 1994) is a Sudanese swimmer. He represented Sudan at the 2016 Summer Olympics in the Men's 50 metre freestyle event where he ranked at #81 with a time of 27.71 seconds. He did not advance to the semifinals.

References

External links 
 

1994 births
Living people
Sudanese male swimmers
Swimmers at the 2016 Summer Olympics
Olympic swimmers of Sudan